James Loughrey (born 10 September 1986) is a Gaelic footballer who plays as a right corner-back at senior level for the Cork county team.

Born in Belfast, Loughrey was educated at Our Lady and St Patrick's College, Knock where he played basketball. He later joined the St Brigid's club, where he first played competitive Gaelic football. Loughrey won junior and intermediate championship medals with the club, before transferring to the Mallow club in 2013. He has also lined out with divisional side Avondhu.

During his studies at Queen's University Belfast, Loughrey was a regular on the university's Gaelic football team. He won a Sigerson Cup medal as a member of the panel in 2007.

Loughrey made his debut on the inter-county scene when he first linked up with the Antrim under-21 team. After little success in this grade, he went on to make his senior debut during the 2007 championship. He was a regular member of the starting fifteen for six seasons and was an Ulster runner-up in 2009. Loughrey transferred to Cork in 2013.

Honours

Queen's University Belfast
Sigerson Cup (1): 2007

St Brigid's
Antrim Junior Football Championship (1): 2004
Antrim Intermediate Football Championship (1): 2006

Mallow
Cork Premier Intermediate Football Championship (1): 2017

Cork
McGrath Cup (2): 2014, 2016

Ulster
Railway Cup (1): 2012

References

1986 births
Living people
Mallow Gaelic footballers
Avondhu Gaelic footballers
Antrim inter-county Gaelic footballers
Cork inter-county Gaelic footballers
Ulster inter-provincial Gaelic footballers
Munster inter-provincial Gaelic footballers
People educated at Our Lady and St. Patrick's College, Knock
Alumni of Queen's University Belfast
Queen's University Belfast Gaelic footballers